Larkspur-Corte Madera School District is a school district headquartered in Larkspur, California. It serves Larkspur and Corte Madera. 
Its schools include Neil Cummins Elementary School, Henry Hall Middle School, and the Cove School.

Henry C. Hall Middle School 

Hall Middle School's Principal is Dr. Toni Brown and its vice principal is Andy Boone . Hall Middle school serves sixth through eighth grade. Hall Middle School itself is located at 200 Doherty Drive.

Neil Cummins Elementary School 

Neil Cummins hosts preschool through fifth grade. Its principal is Patty Elliot.

The Cove School 

The Cove School is Neil Cummins sister school. It was established in 2014. Its principal is Michelle Walker. It hosts Kindergarten through fifth grade.

See also

 Redwood High School
 Tamalpais Union High School District

References

External links
 

School districts in Marin County, California
Corte Madera, California
Larkspur, California